"No Matter What You Do" is a song by Italian DJ Benny Benassi released in his 2002 album Hypnotica. Like "Satisfaction", it uses a female speech synthesizers in the vocals.

Charts

References

2003 singles
2003 songs
Benny Benassi songs
Songs written by Benny Benassi
Songs written by Alle Benassi
Songs written by Dhany